The Nahua people, also academically referred to as Pipil, are an indigenous group of Mesoamerican people inhabiting the western and central areas of present-day El Salvador. Although very few speakers are now left, they speak the Nawat language, which belongs to the Nahuan language branch. Indigenous accounts recorded by Spanish chronicler Gonzalo Francisco de Oviedo suggest that the Nahuas of El Salvador migrated from present-day Mexico to their current locations beginning around the 8th century A.D. As they settled in the area, they founded the city-state of Kuskatan, which was already home to various groups including the Lenca, Xinca, Ch'orti', and Poqomam.

Nahua cosmology is related to that of the Toltec, Mayan and Lenca.

Language, etymology, and synonymy

The term Nahua is a cultural and ethnic term used by Mesoamerican natives for Nahuan-speaking groups. The name Pipil is the most commonly encountered term in the anthropological and linguistic literature. This exonym derives from the closely related Nahuatl word pil (meaning "boy"). The Spanish translated the term pipil as "childish" because of the simple form of Nahuatl spoken, compared to the language of the Tlaxcala and Mexica people from central Mexico. However, the Nahuas do not refer to themselves in this term.

Archaeologist William Fowler notes that pipil can be translated as "noble" and surmises that the invading Spanish and their Indian auxiliaries the Tlaxcala used the name as a reference to the population's elite, known as Pipiltin, who owned land and composed a sovereign society state during the Toltec expansion.

For most authors, the term Pipil or Nawat is used to refer to the language in Central America only (i.e., excluding Mexico). However, the term (along with the synonymous Eastern Nahuatl) has also been used to refer to Nahuan language varieties in the southern Mexican states of Veracruz, Tabasco, and Chiapas, that, like the Nawat in El Salvador, have reduced the earlier /tl/ sound to a /t/. The varieties spoken in these three areas do share greater similarities with Nawat than the other Nahuan varieties do, which suggests a closer connection; however, Campbell (1985) considers Nawat distinct enough to be a language separate from the Nahuan branch, thus rejecting an Eastern Nahuatl subgrouping that includes Nawat.

Dialects of Nawat include the following:
 Ataco
 Tacuba
 Santa Catarina Mazaguat
 Santo Domingo de Guzmán
 Nahuizalco
 Izalco
 Panchimalco
 Teotepeque
 Jicalapa
 Comazagua
 Chiltiupan
 Cuisnahuat

Today Nawat is seldom used except in some rural areas and mostly as phrases sustained in households in the Sonsonate and Ahuachapán departments. Cuisnahuat and Santo Domingo de Guzmán have the highest concentration of Nawat speakers. Campbell's 1985 estimate (fieldwork 1970-1976) was 200 remaining speakers although as many as 2000 speakers have been recorded in official Mexican reports. Gordon (2005) reports only 20 speakers (from 1987). The exact number of speakers is difficult to determine because native Nawat speakers do not wish to be identified due to historic government repression of indigenous Salvadorans, such as La Matanza ("The Massacre") of 1932.

History

A cohesive group sharing a central Mexican culture migrated to Central America during the Late Classic and Early Postclassic period.  Archaeological research suggests these migrants were ethnically and culturally related to the Toltecs.

The Nahuas organized the confederacy, Kuskatan, with at least two centralized city-states that may have been subdivided into smaller principalities. They were also competent workers in cotton textiles and developed a wide-ranging trade network for woven goods as well as agricultural products. Their cultivation of cacao, centered in the Izalcos area and involving a vast and sophisticated irrigation system, was especially lucrative, and trade reached as far north as Teotihuacan and south to Costa Rica.

When their presence was documented by the Spanish in the 16th century, they were identified as "Pipil" and located in the present areas of western El Salvador, as well as south-eastern Guatemala. Poqomam Maya settlements were interspersed around the area of Chalchuapa. 

Some urban centers developed into present-day cities, such as Sonsonate and Ahuachapán. Ruins in Aguilares and those close to the Guazapa volcano are considered to have been Nahua establishments.

Spanish conquest

In the early 16th century, the Spanish conquistadores ventured into Central America from Mexico, then known as the Spanish colony of New Spain. After subduing the highland Mayan city-states through battle and cooptation, the Spanish sought to extend their dominion to the lower pacific region of the Nahua, then dominated by the powerful city-state of Cuscatlán. Pedro de Alvarado, a lieutenant of Hernán Cortés, led the first Spanish invasion in June 1524. He was accompanied by thousands of Tlaxcala and Cakchiquel allies, who had long been rivals of Cuzcatlan for control over their wealthy cacao-producing region. The Nahua warriors met the Spanish forces in two major open battles that send the Spanish army retreating back to Guatemala. The Spaniards eventually returned with reinforcements. The surviving Cuscatlán forces retreated into the mountains, where they sustained a guerrilla war against the allies of the Spanish, who had occupied the city of Cuscatlán. Unable to defeat this resistance, and with Alvarado nursing a painful leg wound from an arrow in the first battle in Acajutla beach, Diego de Alvarado was forced to lead the rest of the conquest. Two subsequent Spanish expeditions were required to achieve the complete defeat of Cuzcatan, in 1525 and again in 1528.

According to legend, a Nahua Cacique or Lord named Atlácatl and Lord Atunal Tut led the Pipil forces against first contact with the Spanish, the most famous battle being the Battle of Acajutla led by Atunal. The Annals of the Cakchiquels mentions the name "Pan Atacat" (water men), in reference to coastal Nahuas (this may have been a title for war chiefs or coastal warriors).

After the Spanish victory, the Nahuas of Kuskatan became vassals of the Spanish Crown and were no longer referred to as Pipiles by the Spanish but simply indios (Indians), in accordance with the Vatican "Discovery doctrine". The term Pipil has therefore remained associated, in mainstream Salvadoran rhetoric, with the pre-conquest indigenous culture. Today it is used by scholars to distinguish the indigenous population in El Salvador from other Nahua-speaking groups (e.g., in Nicaragua). However, neither the self-identified indigenous population nor its political movement, which has revived in recent decades, uses the term "pipil" to describe themselves but instead uses terms such as "Nawataketza" (a speaker of Nawat) or simply "indígenas" (indigenous).

Modern Nahua Culture
Popular accounts of the Nahuas have had a strong influence on the national oral histories of El Salvador, with a large portion of the population claiming ancestry from the Pipil and other groups. Some 86% of today's Salvadorans self-report as mestizos (people of mixed Amerindian and European descent). A small percentage (estimated by the government at 1 percent, by UNESCO at 2 percent, and by scholars at between 2 and 4 percent) is of solely or nearly solely indigenous ancestry, although numbers are disputed for political reasons. Few natives still speak Nawat and follow traditional ways of life. These groups live mainly in the northwestern highlands near the Guatemalan border, but numerous self-identified indigenous populations live in other areas, such as the Nonualcos south of the capital and the Lenca people in the east.

According to a special report in El Diario de Hoy, due to preservation and revitalization efforts of various non-profit organizations in conjunction with several universities, combined with a post-civil war resurgence of Nahua identity in the country of El Salvador, the number of Nawat speakers rose from 200 in the 1980s to 3,000 speakers in 2009. The vast majority of these speakers are young people, a fact that may allow the language to be pulled from the brink of extinction.

There is also a renewed interest in the preservation of traditional customs and other cultural practices, as well as a greater willingness by the communities to perform their ceremonies in public and to wear traditional clothing.

Notable Nahuas of El Salvador
Anastasio Aquino (1792–1833), Tagateku Nonualco war chief 
Prudencia Ayala (1885–1936), indigenous rights activist
Feliciano Ama (1881–1932), Izalco chief
Francisco "Chico" Sánchez, Juayua Chief
Nantzin Paula López Witzapan, poet and Nawat linguist (1959-2016)
Alicia Maria Siu, muralist.

See also

El Mozote massacre (1981), perpetrated by the Salvadoran Army during the Salvadoran Civil War
La Matanza (1932), an indigenous resistance ending in the Republic Army executing and murdering between 10,000 and 40,000 Pipil 
Annals of the Cakchiquels (1571), a manuscript written in the indigenous Kaqchikel language 
Pipil language
Pipil language (typological overview)
Pipil grammar

References

Bibliography
 Bierhorst, John. The Mythology of Mexico and Central America. William Morrow, New York, 1990. .
 Carrasco, David, Editor in chief. The Oxford encyclopedia of Mesoamerican cultures: the civilizations of Mexico and Central America, in four volumes. Oxford University Press, New York, 2001.  (set).
 Campbell, Lyle. (1978). Middle American languages. in L. Campbell & Marianne Mithun (Eds.), The languages of native America: Historical and comparative assessment (pp. 902–1000). Austin: University of Texas Press.
 Campbell, Lyle. (1985). The Pipil language of El Salvador. Mouton grammar library (No. 1). Berlin: Mouton Publishers.
 Campbell, Lyle. (1997). American Indian languages: The historical linguistics of Native America. New York: Oxford University Press. .
 Chapman, Anne M. (1960). Los nicarao y los chorotega según las fuentes históricas. Publicaciones de la Universidad de Costa Rica, Serie historia y geografía 4. San José: Ciudad Universitaria.
 Clavijero, Francisco Xavier. (1974 [1775]). Historia Antigua de México. Mexico: Editorial Porrúa.
 Fernández de Oviedo y Valdés, Gonzalo. (1945 [1557]). Historia general y natural de las Indias, Islas y Tierrafirme del mar de Océano. J. Amador de los Ríos (ed). Asunción, Paraguay: Editorial Guaraní.
 Fowler, William R. (1981). The Pipil-Nicarao of Central America. (Unpublished PhD dissertation, Department of Archaeology, University of Calgary).
 Fowler, William R. (1983). La distribución prehistórica e histórica de los pipiles. Mesoamérica, 6, 348-372.
 de Fuentes y Guzmán, Francisco Antonio. (1932–1933 [1695]). Recordación Florida: Discurso historial y demostración natural, material, militar y política del Reyno de Guatemala. J. A. Villacorta, R. A. Salazar, & S. Aguilar (Eds.). Biblioteca "Goathemala" (Vols. 6-8). Guatemala: Sociedad de Geografía e Historia.
 Raymond G. Gordon Jr. (Ed.). (2005). Ethnologue: Languages of the world (15th ed.). Dallas, Texas: SIL International. . (Online version: www.ethnologue.com).
 Ixtlilxochitl, Don Fernando de Alva. (1952 [1600-1611]). Obras históricas de Don Fernando de Alva Ixtlixochitl, publicadas y anotadas pro Alfredo Chavero. Mexico: Editoria Nacional, S.A.
 . (1959). Síntesis de la historia pretoleca de Mesoamérica., Esplendor del México antiguo (Vol. 2, pp. 1019–1108). Mexico.
 Jiménez Moreno, Wigberto. (1966). Mesoamerica before the Tolteca. In J. Paddock (Ed.), Ancient Oaxaca (pp. 4–82). Stanford: Stanford University Press.
 Lastra de Suarez, Yolanda. 1986. Las áreas dialectales del náhuatl modern. Mexico: Instituto de Investigaciones Antropológicas, Universidad Nacional Autónoma de México.
 Lehmann, Walter. (1920). Zentral-Amerika. Berlin: Dietrich Reimer.
 Miguel León-Portilla. (1972). Religión de los nicaraos: Análisis y comparación de tradiciones culturales nahuas. Mexico: Instituto de Investigaciones Históricas, Universidad Nacional Autónoma de México.
 
 Stoll, Otto. (1958 [1884]). Zur Ethnographie der Republik Guatemala (Etnografía de Guatemala). Seminaro de Integración Social Guatemalteca publication 8.
 Thompson, J. Eric S. (1948). An archaeological reconnaissance in the Cotzumalhuapa region, Escuintla, Guatemala. Carnegie Institution of Washington, Contributions to American anthropology and history (44). Cambridge, Massachusetts.
 Tilley, Virginia. (2005). Seeing Indians: A Study of Race, Nation and Power in El Salvador. University of New Mexico Press.
 de Torquemada, Fray Juan. (1969 [1615]). Monarquía Indiana. Biblioteca Porrúa (Vols. 41-43). Mexico: Librería Porrúa

Further reading

External links
 Facts and legends about the arrival of Nicarao to the shores of Grand Lake and Ometepe
 Fernando Silva article on the historicity of Nicarao
 Pipil (Nawat)
 Nawat language program
 Salvadoran article
 World Book.

 
History of El Salvador
Mesoamerican cultures